"I Have Nothing" is a song by American singer and actress Whitney Houston, released on February 20, 1993 as the third single from The Bodyguard: Original Soundtrack Album (1992) by Arista Records. The song was written by David Foster and Linda Thompson, and produced by Foster.

After the back-to-back successes of Houston's "I Will Always Love You" and "I'm Every Woman," "I Have Nothing" became yet another hit, peaking at number four on the Billboard Hot 100 and being certified Platinum by the Recording Industry Association of America. The song also became a hit on the Billboard Hot R&B Singles chart, with a number four peak, and a number-one peak on the Billboard Adult Contemporary chart. Houston established another historic milestone in Billboard chart history with the two previous singles off the soundtrack and this song, becoming the first artist to have three songs inside the top 11 of the Hot 100 chart in the same week since the chart began using Broadcast Data System and SoundScan data in 1991. Internationally, the song reached number one in Canada, the top five in Ireland and the United Kingdom, the top ten in Denmark and Portugal, and peaked within the top forty in Australia, Germany, the Netherlands, New Zealand, and Switzerland. The song received various nominations, including for the Academy Award for Best Original Song, Grammy Award for Best Song Written for Visual Media, and Soul Train Music Award for Best R&B Single (Female).

The song was promoted by Houston with live performances on her worldwide concert tour, The Bodyguard World Tour (1993–94) only, and also at various awards ceremonies and concerts such as the 4th Billboard Music Awards in 1993, the 21st American Music Awards in 1994, Whitney: The Concert for a New South Africa in 1994, and the 1st BET Awards in 2001. "I Have Nothing" also features on compilations like Whitney: The Greatest Hits (2000) and Whitney Houston Live: Her Greatest Performances (2014).

As with much of Houston's material, the song has been an extremely popular choice on many reality television series around the world, in particular American Idol, on which it has become one of the most performed songs in the show's history; as of 2014, it had been covered eight times. "I Have Nothing" was also featured on the second half of the trailer, for the estate-approved documentary on Houston's life, Whitney.

Critical reception
Stephen Thomas Erlewine from AllMusic viewed the song as a "first-rate urban pop song that skillfully captures Houston at her best" in a review for The Bodyguard soundtrack. Larry Flick from Billboard called it a "booming power ballad", adding that it "has the same lung-bursting drama" as "I Will Always Love You", "tweaked with a quasi-symphonic climax that never fails to push all the right buttons. No need to predict single's future. Just count the minutes to its planting at No. 1." Another editor, Chuck Taylor, in his writing about Britney Spears on October 24, 1998, issue, described "I Have Nothing" as "bombastic and ultra-challenging." Jan DeKnock of Chicago Tribune said it is "yet another scorcher of a ballad" from the soundtrack. Dave Sholin from the Gavin Report complimented Houston's "emotionally-charged performance".

James Masterton wrote in his weekly UK chart commentary, "A classic ballad like the Whitney we used to know and love showing her voice off to best effect and making a deservedly high new entry." Howard Cohen from The Miami Herald noted that "she soars effortlessly as she belts out the brass-inflected ballad". James Montgomery of MTV said the song was "untouchable." Alan Jones from Music Week described it as "an emotionally charged rollercoaster of a song, giving Ms Houston another chance to display her range." Stephen Holden of The New York Times wrote that the song and "Run to You" are "booming generic ballads to which Houston applies her typical stentorian delivery." James T. Jones IV of USA Today commented that "[the song] and 'Run to You' are thrilling ballads, powered by an operatic coloratura alto."

Accolades
"I Have Nothing" was nominated for Best Original Song at the 65th Annual Academy Awards on March 29, 1993. David Foster and Linda Thompson were nominated for Best Song Written Specifically for a Motion Picture, Television or Other Visual Media for the song at the 36th Annual Grammy Awards on March 1, 1994. The song was also nominated for Best R&B Single, Female but lost to Toni Braxton's "Breathe Again" at the 8th Annual Soul Train Music Awards on March 15, 1994. Foster and Thompson received the award for Most Performed Song from a Film for the song at the 10th BMI Film & Television Awards on May 17, 1994.

In 2012, Porcys listed it at number 99 in their ranking of "100 Singles 1990-1999". In 2017, ShortList's Dave Fawbert listed the song as containing "one of the greatest key changes in music history".

Commercial performance
"I Have Nothing" was released as the third single from The Bodyguard Soundtrack in February 1993. The single debuted at number 42 on the Billboard Hot 100 Singles chart, the issue date of February 27, 1993, when her two songs, "I Will Always Love You" and "I'm Every Woman" still placed within the top ten. Remarkably, for the weeks on the Billboard Hot 100 chart ending March 13 and 20, Houston had three songs inside the top 11, making her the first artist to achieve the trifecta on the same week since 1991, when the Hot 100 using Broadcast Data System and SoundScan data. On the Hot 100 Airplay chart, Houston equaled the feat with the aforementioned tracks on the February 27 and March 6 issues. The song peaked at number four on the Hot 100 on the April 3 issue, becoming Houston's 14th top five hit, spending 20 weeks on the chart. The single entered the Billboard Hot R&B Singles chart at number 37 on the February 27 issue and peaked at number four on the chart in the April 10 issue. The song reached number one on the Billboard Hot Adult Contemporary chart the issue dated May 1, 1993, and remained there for two weeks, becoming her tenth number-one song on the chart. It placed at number thirty and thirty-two on the Billboard Year-End Hot 100 and Hot R&B Singles charts respectively. On the Cash Box pop singles charts, the song peaked at number one each on the week of April 10, 1993. On Cash Box's R&B chart, it peaked at number two behind Silk's "Freak Me" on the week of April 24 of 1993. The single was certified Gold for shipments of 500,000 copies or more by the Recording Industry Association of America on June 1, 1993. On March 11, 2019, it was certified platinum for shipments of 1 million copies or more by the Recording Industry Association of America and then, two years later, on what would've been Houston's 58th birthday, the song was certified double-platinum for sales of 2 million copies or more. 

In Canada, the song debuted at number 50 on the RPM Top 100 Hit Tracks chart on March 13, 1993, and four weeks later reached the top ten. In its eighth week of release, on May 1, 1993, the single topped the chart and spent three weeks at the summit, staying on the chart for 18 weeks. The song entered the RPM Adult Contemporary Tracks chart at number 20 in the same week of its top 100 debut. Within five weeks, it hit the pole position of the chart on April 17, 1993, and stayed on the top for six weeks.

Worldwide, the song was a success but not as big as two previous singles from its parent soundtrack. In the United Kingdom, the single debuted at number nine on the UK Singles Chart on April 24, 1993, and the following week peaked at number three on the chart, making it Houston's ninth UK top five hit. According to The Official Charts Company, the single sold 220,000 copies in the country. It peaked at number four in Ireland, number 16 in Belgium, and number 20 in New Zealand. The song also reached a peak of number 28 in Australia, number 50 in France, number 39 in Germany, number 22 in the Netherlands, and number 39 in Switzerland.

Music video
A music video was produced to promote the single, directed by S. A. Baron. It depicts Houston performing the song to an audience in a dining room hall. The video is intercut with scenes from the film (The Bodyguard, the same thing for I Will Always Love You). It was later published on Houston's official YouTube channel in November 2009. The video has amassed more than 700 million views as of February 2023.

Live performances

Houston performed "I Have Nothing" at the 4th Billboard Music Awards on December 9, 1993, receiving a standing ovation. Chris Willman of Los Angeles Times commented on the performance, saying "Houston's physically stationary, vocally mobile approach to the ballad―backlit behind the mike in a she-got-back-her-figure-flattering gown―effectively heightened the tune's diva dramaturgy, making it an easy highlight in a night otherwise short on compelling performances." She also performed a rousing 10-minute-medley of show tunes that ended with the song―"I Loves You, Porgy" from Porgy and Bess, "And I Am Telling You I'm Not Going" from Dreamgirls, and "I Have Nothing"―at the 21st Annual American Music Awards, where she won the record eight awards, on February 7, 1994. This performance was included in the 2014 CD/DVD release, Whitney Houston Live: Her Greatest Performances. Jet magazine wrote about the AMA performance that "she [Houston] brought the house down with her soulful, stirring medley renditions."

On November 12, 1994, Houston sang the song during the concert in Johannesburg, South Africa, entitled Whitney: The Concert for a New South Africa, telecast live via satellite on HBO. The performance is found in VHS and DVD with the same title of the concert, originally released in December 1994, and later re-released on June 24, 2010. The song was also performed on the concert to celebrate the wedding of Brunei royalty, at the Jerudong Park Garden on August 24, 1996. Houston sang the short-edited version of the song along with "I Will Always Love You," which were followed by a standing ovation, at the 1st BET Awards on June 19, 2001, becoming the first artist ever to be given the Lifetime Achievement Award.

Though "I Have Nothing" is one of Houston's notable hits during her career, the song was performed solely on The Bodyguard World Tour (1993–94) among her ten tours. Houston performed the song as the final part of a medley which included the aforementioned songs from Broadway shows on first North American leg of the tour in 1993, but since the European leg in 1993, the song was performed solely without two show tunes on almost all the rest of the tour dates. Four performances of the song on the South American leg of the tour (1994) were broadcast on each country's TV channel: Rio de Janeiro, Brazil on January 23, Santiago, Chile on April 14, Buenos Aires, Argentina on April 16, and Caracas, Venezuela on April 21.

Cover versions

Official recording versions
Filipino singer Charice Pempengco recorded a version of the song on her debut release, the self-titled Charice EP released in May 2008. Korean singer SunMin has a cover of the song on her mini album Cover Girl, released in Japan, August 2008. The Italian variety TV show, Ti Lascio Una Canzone alumna Sonia Mosca covered the song on the compilation album Ti Lascio Una Canzone - La Compilation, released in May 2009. In 2012, the song is performed on the TV musical series Glee in episode 17 of season 3, "Dance with Somebody", by Chris Colfer (as his character Kurt Hummel). The whole episode pays tribute to Whitney Houston and her music.

Demonstration versions
Jessica Simpson recorded a version of the song as a demonstration when she was a teenager age. Britney Spears revealed on VH1's Behind the Music, originally aired on November 9, 2003, that she recorded a demonstration of the song before she was signed to Jive Records. Spears also later sang the song at her Jive audition at the age of fifteen.

Live cover versions
On behalf of Houston who had given birth to a daughter the three weeks before the ceremony, Natalie Cole crooned Houston's two nominated songs including "I Have Nothing" at the 65th Annual Academy Awards on March 29, 1993.

Patti LaBelle performed the song as a tribute to Whitney Houston, the first ever recipient of the Triumphant Spirit Award at the 10th annual Essence Awards, taped on April 4, 1997, and broadcast later on Fox TV, May 22, 1997.

Leona Lewis performed the song during the semi-finals of the third season of The X Factor. She later went on to win the season.

Ariana Grande performed "I Have Nothing" in 2014 at The White House, along with some select dates such as Manila on her Honeymoon Tour.

Jessie J regularly covered the song on her Sweet Talker Tour in 2015 and 2016. She performed it again in 2018 while competing on the sixth season of the Chinese competition show Singer, which she went on to win.

Edyta Górniak performed this song with David Foster on the stage of Indonesia's 71st Independence Day Celebration.

Christina Aguilera performed the song with a hologram of Houston during the finale of Season 10 of The Voice, which was cut due to failing to meet "high production standards." The performance leaked online several days before the finale aired. Aguilera performed it again at the 2017 American Music Awards.

Drake samples this song for "Tuscan Leather" from his third studio album Nothing Was the Same.

Track listings and formats

 UK 12-inch vinyl single
A1. "I Have Nothing" ― 4:45
A2. "All the Man That I Need" ― 3:54
B1. "Where You Are" ― 4:10
B2. "Lover for Life" ― 4:48

 European 7-inch vinyl single; Japanese 3-inch CD single
A. "I Have Nothing" ― 4:45
B. "Where You Are" ― 4:10

 UK 7-inch vinyl single
A. "I Have Nothing" ― 4:45
B. "All the Man That I Need" ― 3:54

 US maxi-CD single; European maxi-CD single; UK maxi-CD single
 "I Have Nothing" ― 4:45
 "Where You Are" ― 4:10
 "Lover for Life" ― 4:48

 UK CD single
 "I Have Nothing" ― 4:45
 "All the Man That I Need" ― 3:54
 "Where You Are" ― 4:10
 "Lover for Life" ― 4:48

Credits and personnel
Credits are adapted from The Bodyguard: Original Soundtrack Album liner notes.

"I Have Nothing"
 Whitney Houston – performer
 David Foster – producer, arranger
 Jeremy Lubbock and David Foster – string arrangement
 Dave Reitzas – recording engineer
 Mick Guzauski – mixing engineer

Charts and certifications

Weekly charts

Year-end charts

Certifications

Release history

References

External links
 I Have Nothing at Discogs

Whitney Houston songs
1993 singles
1992 songs
Arista Records singles
Song recordings produced by David Foster
Songs written by David Foster
Songs written by Linda Thompson (actress)
Songs written for films
RPM Top Singles number-one singles
Pop ballads
1990s ballads
Contemporary R&B ballads
Film scores
1991 songs
Soul ballads